Entandrophragma utile, called the sipo or utile, is a species of large tree in the genus Entandrophragma, native to nearly all of tropical Africa facing the Atlantic, from Guinea to Angola, and as far east as Uganda. The timber is traded as a tropical hardwood. It is sometimes called sipo mahogany. It shares many of the characteristics of genuine mahogany and is used as an alternative.

References

utile
Trees of Africa
Plants described in 1910